The Promise is the fifth studio album by the classical crossover group, Il Divo. The Promise was released globally on 10 November 2008, except in the US and Canada, where it was released 17 November, Ireland and Mexico where it was released on 7 November, and Japan, on 26 November.
 The album reached the No.1 spot in the UK on 16 November. The album was produced by Steve Mac. It was announced on 10 September, that it will be named The Promise, although the track listing was at this time not yet disclosed. In early messages to people who are members of the band's official site's mailing list, it revealed to them that 'Il Divo return with their richest and most diverse album to date.' It also revealed that the album would have twelve songs. Cover songs confirmed at this time were: Frankie Goes To Hollywood's "The Power of Love";  'a haunting and beautiful interpretation of Leonard Cohen's "Hallelujah"'; the smouldering intensity of Lara Fabian's "Adagio"; and the fourth confirmed song then was ABBA's "The Winner Takes It All".

The Promise contains seven covers of existing songs, along with four new songs written especially for the album. The new songs included are: "La Promessa" (Italian), "Enamorado" (Spanish), "Angelina" (Spanish) and "La Luna" (Italian). Also contained on the album is a cover of the chart topping song "She" made famous by French tenor Charles Aznavour. "L'Alba Del Mondo" is an Italian adaptation of the song "I Knew I Loved You", a famous song based on "Deborah's Theme" from Once Upon A Time in America and written by Ennio Morricone. The final track on the album is a cover of the traditional hymn, "Amazing Grace".

On 24 October 2008, Il Divo flew across the ocean overnight specially for The Oprah Winfrey Show after they had been called by Winfrey on the phone on their way in the airport for a post-album recording vacation, to give a special performance on the show, where they performed the song "Amazing Grace". Following this the hymn made it into the MTV US top 20.

The album peaked No. 1 on the top classical albums on Billboard charts, and up until 12 September 2009, spent 43 straight weeks in the Top 10 list.

The album was released globally on 10 November 2008, except in the US and Canada, where it was released on 18 November 2008, Ireland where it was released on 7 November 2008, and Japan, on 26 November 2008. The album reached the No.1 spot in the UK on 16 November 2008. The album was produced by Steve Mac. According to the credits on the DVDs, the bagpipes in Amazing Grace, both on this album and in the performance on the In the Coliseum DVD, are played by Robert White.

Track listing

Charts

Weekly charts

Year-end charts

Certifications and sales

References

2008 albums
Il Divo albums
Columbia Records albums
Syco Music albums